Marguerite Agnes Power (1815–1867) was a British novelist, writer for periodicals, and editor throughout the majority of her life.

Biography
Power was born in 1815 to Agnes and Colonel Robert Power. She is thought to have spent her childhood in Ireland where her father managed the estates in County Tyrone after he returned from a career in the British army.

She was a respectable, hardworking writer who was frequently poor. She is often forgotten despite her many contributions. However, her legacy remains within her many works including her contributions to The Keepsake, Book of Beauty and also to the Illustrated London News and other periodicals. She is known for her memoir of her aunt Lady Blessington as well as her book Arabian Days and Nights (1863), which is an account of a winter's residence in Egypt. Miss Power died in July 1867 after a long illness.

Works
Books as writer
 Evelyn Forester: A Woman's Story (1856) 
 The Foresters, 2 vols 
 Letters of a Betrothed (1858)
 Nelly Carew, 2 vols (1859)
 Sweethearts and Wives, 3 vols (1861)
As editor
 The Keepsake, annual volumes for 1851 to 1857
Power also  contributed to Irish Metropolitan Magazine, Forget-me-not, and  Once a Week.

References

External links
 

1815 births
1867 deaths
19th-century English writers
19th-century English women writers
19th-century British writers